Barelić is a village in the municipality of Vranje, Serbia. According to the 2002 census, the village has a population of 161 people.

The village includes a hamlet called Sveti Ilija, which is the location of a post office with post code 17508.

References

Populated places in Pčinja District